"Indian River" is a poem from Wallace Stevens's first book of poetry,  Harmonium. It was first published in 1917. Absent from the first edition of 1923, it appeared in the second edition of 1931. It is in the public domain.

Interpretation

The linked prepositional phrases oblige the reader to construct complex visual images of the Floridian scenes, and the focus on jingling in each sentence brings sound to the images as well. The similarity of  syntactic structure in the first three sentences induces an almost hypnotic effect, like repetition of a mantra. The final sentence may betray the poet's diffidence about the prospects for renewal, as in Depression Before Spring, or, as Cook suggests, it may simply reflect Stevens's belief that Florida had no spring.

Notes

References 

 Cook, Eleanor. A Reader's Guide to Wallace Stevens. Princeton: Princeton University Press.
 Stevens, H. Letters of Wallace Stevens. 1966: University of California Press

1917 poems
American poems
Poetry by Wallace Stevens